Wrzeszcz Dolny (translated Lower Wrzeszcz) is an administrative district (dzielnica administracyjna) of the city of Gdańsk, Poland. It was created in 2010 by division of the district Wrzeszcz  in two districts.

History 
In October 2010, some administrative districts of Gdańsk with a population of more than 50,000 had been divided in smaller districts. Wrzeszcz has been divided in Wrzeszcz Dolny and Wrzeszcz Górny.

Location 
The district is the north-eastern and younger part of Wrzeszcz. The division was made along the railway line.

From the north, the district is bordered by the districts of Zaspa-Rozstaje and Brzeźno, from the east by Letnica and Młyniska, from the south by Aniołki and from the west by Wrzeszcz Górny and Zaspa-Młyniec.

Quarters of Wrzeszcz Dolny are:
 Kolonia 
 Kuźniczki 
 Nowe Szkoty
 Polenhof

Points of interest 

 Gdańsk Wrzeszcz railway station
 Old brewery
 Park Kuźniczki
 Park nad Strzyżą
 Cemetery near Zaspa (Cmentarz na Zaspie - Cmentarz Ofiar Hitleryzmu)

Notable residents 
 Günter Grass (1927―2015), German novelist, poet, playwright, illustrator, graphic artist, sculptor, and recipient of the 1999 Nobel Prize in Literature
 Jacek Szafranowicz (1983― ), Polish poet

References

External links 

 bip.gdansk.pl: Podział administracyjny Gdańska (Polish)
 gedanopedia.pl: Wrzeszcz (Polish)

Districts of Gdańsk